The 2017 Rugby Europe Championship is the premier rugby union competition outside of the Six Nations Championship in Europe. It is the inaugural Championship under its new format, that saw Belgium, Georgia, Germany, Romania, Russia and Spain compete for the title.

This year's edition of the Rugby Europe Championship also served as the 2019 Rugby World Cup qualifiers for the European region. The team with the best record across the 2017 and 2018 Championships qualifies as Europe 1. As Georgia have already secured qualification automatically, in the event of a Georgian win, the runner-up will take the Europe 1 qualification spot.
In respect of matters relating to the eligibility of players, following a full review of the evidence, including statements and submissions from World Rugby, Rugby Europe, Belgium, Romania, Spain and Russia, the independent committee found:
Belgium had fielded one or more ineligible players on 7 occasions during the 2017 and 2018 Rugby Europe Championships (of which 6 matches related to Rugby World Cup 2019 qualifying) Romania has fielded one ineligible player on 8 occasions during the 2017 and 2018 Rugby Europe Championships (of which 6 matches related to Rugby World Cup 2019 qualifying)
Spain had fielded one or more ineligible players on 9 occasions during the 2017 and 2018 Rugby Europe Championships (of which 8 matches related to Rugby World Cup 2019 qualifying)
In respect of the sanctions, pursuant to Regulation 18, the independent committee determined the following:
The deduction of 5 points for any match in which a union fielded an ineligible player (40-point deduction for Spain, and a 30-point deduction for both Belgium and Romania). Therefore, based on a re-modelling of the Rugby Europe Championship tables in the context of Rugby World Cup 2019 qualifying, Russia would qualify as Europe 1 into Pool A replacing Romania and Germany will replace Spain in the European play-off against Portugal. As the tournament for 2017 had been completed and issues of relegation had been decided in that year, the points deduction were not be applied to the 2017 Rugby Europe tournament.

Table

Fixtures

Week 1

Week 2

Week 3

Week 4

Week 5

Relegation/promotion play-off

See also 
 Rugby Europe International Championships
 2016–17 Rugby Europe International Championships
 Six Nations Championship
 Antim Cup

References

External links
 Rugby Europe official website

2016-17
2016–17 Rugby Europe International Championships
2016–17 in Belgian rugby union
2016–17 in Spanish rugby union
2016–17 in German rugby union
2017 in Russian rugby union
2017 in Georgian sport
2016–17 in Romanian rugby union